St. Joseph's School, Pakartalla is a private, coeducational, English-medium school located about 2 km from the town of Kahalgaon, Bhagalpur district in the state of Bihar, India. While founded and operated by the Catholic Church, it accepts students without regard to caste or religion. Established in 1989, the school today enrolls as many as 2500 and has an alumni base of approximately 800.

Location
The school is located at a distance of about 2 km from Kahalgaon town in the suburb of Pakartalla. The school is approximately 4 km from Ekchari and 9 km from Ghogha.  Located on the banks of river Ganges it has the National Highway No. 80 on one side and Howrah-Kiul railway line on the other side. The school draws the attention of a wide range of students, parents and guardians from Kahalgaon, Ekchari, Ghogha and some other remote areas nearby.

History
The dream of establishing a school in Pakartalla was realized by Rev. Fr. Joseph Thanniparampil, who bought a piece of land in 1988 with the encouragement of Urban Eugen McGarry, T.O.R, Bishop of Bhagalpur. It was inaugurated by Bishop George Victor Saupin, S.J. on 3 April 1989. The Sisters of Providence of Gap provided teaching staff from February to July 1989, after which sisters of the Religious of the Assumption assumed duties. 

Under Saupin's successor, Bishop Thomas Kozhimala, the school received NOC from the state government. The school was provisionally affiliated to the Council for the Indian School Certificate Examinations, New Delhi on 3 February 1999 and permanently affiliated on 18 September 2002.

The first batch passed out Class Xth ICSE Board in the year 2000 with a strength of 31 students with 100% pass percentage. The school has been constantly ranked as one of the best not only in District but the entire state of Bihar. The school has a wide and diversified alumni networks

References

External links 
 Official Website
 Kahalgaon.com

Christian schools in Bihar
Education in Bhagalpur district
Educational institutions established in 1989
1989 establishments in Bihar